Sporophyla oenospora is a species of moth in the family Pyralidae. It is endemic to New Zealand. It is classified as critically endangered by the Department of Conservation.

Taxonomy
This species was first described by Edward Meyrick in 1897 under the name Crocydopora oenospora. The type specimen was collected at Castle Hill and is held in the Natural History Museum, London. George Vernon Hudson subsequently placed this species within the genus Sporophyla.

Description

Meyrick described the species as follows:

Distribution
S. oenospora is endemic to New Zealand. As well as occurring at Castle Hill, this species has also been collected at Ida Valley, Alexandra and Ben Lormond.

Conservation status
This moth is now classified under the New Zealand Threat Classification system as being Nationally Critical.

References

Moths of New Zealand
Moths described in 1897
Phycitinae
Endemic fauna of New Zealand
Taxa named by Edward Meyrick
Endangered biota of New Zealand
Endemic moths of New Zealand